Burghart is a surname. Notable people with the surname include:

Alex Burghart (born 1977), British politician
Hermann Burghart (1834–1901), Bohemian-born Austrian scenic designer and set decorator
Ralph Burghart (born 1966), Austrian figure skater and coach

German-language surnames
Surnames of German origin